Éder Diego Holanda do Nascimento, known as Éder Diego (born 17 April 1985) is a Brazilian football player who plays for União de Leiria.

Club career
He made his professional debut in the Segunda Liga for Desportivo das Aves on 16 August 2009 in a game against Freamunde.

References

External links

1985 births
Sportspeople from Belém
Living people
Brazilian footballers
Brazilian expatriate footballers
Expatriate footballers in Portugal
S.C. Braga B players
Moreirense F.C. players
C.D. Aves players
Liga Portugal 2 players
G.D. Ribeirão players
F.C. Famalicão players
U.D. Leiria players
Association football midfielders